Velykyi Rakovets is a village located in western Ukraine, within the Khust Raion in Zakarpattia Oblast, although it was formerly administered under Irshava Raion.

It had a population of 4,549 according to the 2001 census.

See also
 Carpathian Ruthenia

References

External links
genealogical talk thread about Velky Rakovicz and similar sounding locations, includes links to maps

Villages in Khust Raion